Chernihiv Oblast is subdivided into districts (raions) which are further subdivided into territorial communities (hromadas).

Current

On 18 July 2020, the number of districts was reduced to five. These are:

 Chernihiv (Чернігівський район), the center is in the city of Chernihiv;
 Koriukivka (Корюківський район), the center is in the city of Koriukivka;
 Nizhyn (Ніжинський район), the center is in the city of Nizhyn;
 Novhorod-Siverskyi (Новгород-Сіверський район), the center is in the city of Novhorod-Siverskyi;
 Pryluky (Прилуцький район), the center is in the city of Pryluky.

Administrative divisions until 2020

Before 2020, Chernihiv Oblast was subdivided into 26 regions: 22 districts (raions) and 4 city municipalities (mis'krada or misto), officially known as territories governed by city councils.
Cities under the oblast's jurisdiction:
Chernihiv (Чернігів), the administrative center of the oblast
Nizhyn (Ніжин)
Novhorod-Siverskyi Municipality 
Cities under the city's jurisdiction:
Novhorod-Siverskyi (Новгород-Сіверський)
Pryluky (Прилуки)
Districts (raions):
Bakhmach  (Бахмацький район)
Cities under the district's jurisdiction:
Bakhmach (Бахмач)
Baturyn (Батурин)
Urban-type settlements under the district's jurisdiction:
Dmytrivka (Дмитрівка)
Bobrovytsia  (Бобровицький район)
Cities under the district's jurisdiction:
Bobrovytsia (Бобровиця)
Borzna  (Борзнянський район)
Cities under the district's jurisdiction:
Borzna (Борзна)
Chernihiv  (Чернігівський район)
Urban-type settlements under the district's jurisdiction:
Honcharivske (Гончарівське)
Mykhailo-Kotsiubynske (Михайло-Коцюбинське)
Olyshivka (Олишівка)
Sedniv (Седнів)
Horodnia  (Городнянський район)
Cities under the district's jurisdiction:
Horodnia (Городня)
Ichnia  (Ічнянський район)
Cities under the district's jurisdiction:
Ichnia (Ічня)
Urban-type settlements under the district's jurisdiction:
Druzhba (Дружба)
Parafiivka (Парафіївка)
Koriukivka  (Корюківський район)
Cities under the district's jurisdiction:
Koriukivka (Корюківка)
Urban-type settlements under the district's jurisdiction:
Kholmy (Холми)
Korop  (Коропський район)
Urban-type settlements under the district's jurisdiction:
Korop (Короп)
Ponornytsia (Понорниця)
Kozelets  (Козелецький район)
Cities under the district's jurisdiction:
Oster (Остер)
Urban-type settlements under the district's jurisdiction:
Desna (Десна)
Kozelets (Козелець)
Kulykivka  (Куликівський район)
Urban-type settlements under the district's jurisdiction:
Kulykivka (Куликівка)
Mena  (Менський район)
Cities under the district's jurisdiction:
Mena (Мена)
Urban-type settlements under the district's jurisdiction:
Berezna (Березна)
Makoshyne (Макошине)
Nizhyn  (Ніжинський район)
Urban-type settlements under the district's jurisdiction:
Losynivka (Лосинівка)
Nosivka  (Носівський район)
Cities under the district's jurisdiction:
Nosivka (Носівка)
Novhorod-Siverskyi  (Новгород-Сіверський район)
Pryluky  (Прилуцький район)
Urban-type settlements under the district's jurisdiction:
Ladan (Ладан)
Lynovytsia (Линовиця)
Mala Divytsia (Мала Дівиця)
Ripky  (Ріпкинський район)
Urban-type settlements under the district's jurisdiction:
Dobrianka (Добрянка)
Liubech (Любеч)
Radul (Радуль)
Ripky (Ріпки)
Zamhlai (Замглай)
Semenivka  (Семенівський район)
Cities under the district's jurisdiction:
Semenivka (Семенівка)
Snovsk  (Сновський район), formerly Shchors Raion
Cities under the district's jurisdiction:
Snovsk (Сновськ), formerly Shchors
Sosnytsia  (Сосницький район)
Urban-type settlements under the district's jurisdiction:
Sosnytsia (Сосниця)
Sribne  (Срібнянський район)
Urban-type settlements under the district's jurisdiction:
Dihtiari (Дігтярі)
Sribne (Срібне)
Talalaivka  (Талалаївський район)
Urban-type settlements under the district's jurisdiction:
Talalaivka (Талалаївка)
Varva  (Варвинський район)
Urban-type settlements under the district's jurisdiction:
Varva (Варва)

References

Chernihiv
Chernihiv Oblast